The Suifenhe–Manzhouli corridor is a high-speed rail corridor located in the northeast of China running from Suifenhe in Heilongjiang to Manzhouli in Inner Mongolia. Announced as part of the "eight vertical and eight horizontal" high-speed railway network, the passage passes through Harbin and Qiqihar.

Sections

References

See also 
 High-speed rail in China

High-speed rail in China